Syrianska IF Kerburan is a Swedish based football club in the city of Västerås. The club, formed in 1977 by Aramean (Syriac) immigrants, has advanced through the league system and is currently playing in the fourth highest Swedish league, Division 2.

History 
Syrianska IF Kerburan was established in 1977. The first name on the club was Kerburan IF, because of the large Aramean (Syriac) immigrants from the Aramean village Kerburan, Turkey. The name was later changed to Syrianska IF Kerburan in 1993.

The club is affiliated to the Västmanlands Fotbollförbund.

Current squad 
.

Season to season

Attendances 

In recent seasons Syrianska IF Kerburan have had the following average attendances:

* Attendances are provided in the Publikliga sections of the Svenska Fotbollförbundet website. 
|}

See also
List of Assyrian-Syriac football teams in Sweden

References

External links 
 Syrianska IF Kerburan – official site

Assyrian football clubs
Assyrian/Syriac football clubs in Sweden
Football clubs in Västmanland County
Association football clubs established in 1977
Sport in Västmanland County
1977 establishments in Sweden
Diaspora sports clubs
Sport in Västerås